The Sisters of Mercy are an English rock band, formed in 1980 in Leeds. After achieving early underground fame there, the band had their commercial breakthrough in the mid-1980s and sustained it until the early 1990s, when they stopped releasing new recorded output in protest against their record company WEA. Currently, the band are a touring outfit only.

The group has released three original studio albums: First and Last and Always (1985), Floodland (1987), and Vision Thing (1990). Each album was recorded by a different line-up; singer-songwriter Andrew Eldritch and the drum machine called Doktor Avalanche are the only points of continuity throughout. Eldritch and Avalanche were also involved in The Sisterhood, a side-project connected with Eldritch's dispute with former members.

The Sisters of Mercy ceased recording activity in the early 1990s, when they went on strike against East West Records, whom they accused of incompetence and withholding royalties, and had pressured the group to release at least two more studio albums; instead, the label released the album Go Figure under the moniker SSV in 1997. Although the Sisters of Mercy were eventually released from their contract with East West, they have never been signed to another label nor released any new material, despite showcasing numerous new songs in their live sets.

Former members of the group established the bands Ghost Dance and The Mission.

History

Early years (1980–1983)
The Sisters of Mercy were formed in Leeds, England, in 1980 by Gary Marx and Andrew Eldritch, to satisfy their desire to hear themselves on the radio. During this time a single, "Damage Done/Watch/Home of the Hit-men", was recorded and released. The band name was influenced by Robert Altman's film McCabe & Mrs. Miller (1971), which featured the Leonard Cohen song "Sisters of Mercy" from his album Songs of Leonard Cohen, "because [calling ourselves] the Captains of Industry wouldn't have been as funny".

On the single Marx played guitar through a practice amplifier and Eldritch was on drums that he had bought from Jon Langford. The duo each wrote and sang on a song: Eldritch on "Damage Done", Marx on "Watch".

The band regrouped with Craig Adams on bass, while Eldritch's drumming was replaced by a drum machine, leaving him to concentrate on vocals. The drum machine was christened "Doktor Avalanche", and all of its numerous successors kept this moniker. Eldritch took over lyrics-writing, Doktor-programming, and record-producing duties, while co-writing the music with Marx and (occasionally) Adams.

This became what is generally recognised as the first real Sisters line-up. It began with the Doktor/Eldritch/Marx/Adams incarnation of the band playing a gig in the Riley Smith Hall of the Leeds University Union building in early 1981. Since nobody can remember the exact date, for historic purposes the band and fans have often celebrated the anniversary of the concert of 16 February 1981, in Alcuin College, York which was the band's second gig. Later in 1981, Ben Gunn was recruited as the Sisters' second guitarist. Eldritch's melancholic baritone, Craig Adams's pulsating bass, Doktor Avalanche's beat and Marx's flowing guitar led the band to early underground success. In 1982, the band recorded "The Body Electric" b/w "Adrenochrome" single for the CNT label.

The band's singles were regularly featured in UK independent charts; some became single of the week in various UK indie magazines. John Ashton of the Psychedelic Furs produced the early classic "Alice". The Reptile House E.P. is another example of early Sisters work and marks the maturing songwriter Eldritch (who wrote, produced and [reportedly] played all instruments on it).

Their live performances featured many cover versions: among those, a medley consisting of "Sister Ray" (by the Velvet Underground), "Ghostrider" (by Suicide) and "Louie Louie" (by Richard Berry) became a live staple. Only four of them, the Stooges' "1969", the Rolling Stones' "Gimme Shelter", Hot Chocolate's "Emma" and Bob Dylan's "Knockin' on Heaven's Door" were eventually recorded and released on Sisters records (all as B-sides).

In late 1983, following the highly successful "Temple of Love" single, the band signed a contract with major record label WEA. At the same time Gunn left in an atmosphere of unanimous bitterness. Gunn stated that he did not agree with the direction Eldritch was taking the band, which, according to Gunn, started out as a joke on serious rock 'n' roll outfits, but eventually became one. Gunn also mentioned personality conflicts with Eldritch as a reason for his departure.

First and Last and Always era (1984–1985)
Gunn was replaced by Wayne Hussey, who concentrated on 12-string electric and acoustic guitars while also contributing as a songwriter. His studio experience with Dead or Alive also proved to be invaluable as the Sisters set out to record their first full-length album. The Black October UK tour (October–November 1984) confirmed the underground cult status of the band. However, the growing alienation between Eldritch and the rest of the group was getting out of hand during the recording of the debut First and Last and Always album. Eldritch's deteriorating health and psychological problems worsened the situation. The causes of these issues were frequently written about in the gossip columns of the music press, NME, Melody Maker and Sounds.

Most songs on the album were written and rehearsed by Marx, Hussey, and Adams, with Eldritch stepping in at the last stage to write lyrics and add vocals.

Following the release of First and Last and Always, produced by David M. Allen, Marx split from the band in the middle of a supporting tour, citing inability to continue working with Eldritch. The Sisters of Mercy completed the tour as a three-piece act, and said farewell to the fans with the final gig in London's Royal Albert Hall on 18 June 1985. Video recordings of this show were later released as "Wake". A music video of the song "Black Planet" was also released in which the Monkeemobile was featured. Promotional videos were also made for the singles "Body and Soul", "Walk Away", and "No Time to Cry", but none of these videos, including "Black Planet", have been officially released yet by the band.

The split: the Sisterhood and the Mission (1985–1986)
Shortly after the last gig Eldritch relocated to Hamburg, where he was soon joined by Hussey. Their intention was to begin working on a follow-up album, tentatively titled Left on Mission and Revenge. Hussey had several written songs for the album, including "Dance on Glass" and "Garden of Delight". Demo versions of both songs featuring Eldritch on vocals have since surfaced, suggesting the band did work on the material in unison.

When Adams and Hussey left the band, they were replaced by the American singer and bass guitarist Patricia Morrison of The Bags and the Gun Club. 

Hussey and Adams went on to form a new group called the Sisterhood. Their setlists featured songs Hussey had intended for the Sisters of Mercy; he would later record and release many of them with his new group. Meanwhile, Eldritch protested against their usage of the Sisterhood name as too similar to the Sisters of Mercy and the name of his band's fan community. In an attempt to stop Hussey's band Eldritch released the single "Giving Ground" by his own band, the Sisterhood. The single was later followed by the album Gift. Hussey's band eventually christened themselves the Mission. Hussey has since expressed regret about the entire incident.

According to some sources, with these releases Eldritch allegedly won, over Hussey and Adams, a race for a £25,000 advance (a sum opening the song "Jihad" on the Gift album) offered by the publishers to the first member of the Sisters of Mercy to release any output. This would tie Eldritch to WEA, and release Hussey and Adams from their contract with the same record company. According to the Mission's manager Tony Perrin, the case never went to court and Hussey's new band was able to release their material through an independent outlet. However, Eldritch stated elsewhere that the "2-5-0-0-0" which opens "Jihad" on the Sisterhood LP represents the sum of money he won from the Mission in the civil courts. He states in an interview, recorded in Boston, that the English courts did not recognise either his or the other members' of the band's legal right to the name "the Sisterhood". He said the courts required a release for anybody to claim ownership of the band name, which was the motivation for the initial Sisterhood single. After that single had been released, Eldritch officially owned the name, and could sue, which he did, winning £25,000 in the lawsuit.

Floodland era (1987–1989)
Left to his own devices, Eldritch recorded Floodland, marking a shift away from guitar-based rock towards an atmospheric, Wagnerian rock and keyboard-oriented explorations pioneered on Gift. The album was produced by Eldritch and Larry Alexander, with contributions from Jim Steinman on two songs, one of them being "This Corrosion".

"This Corrosion" was a composition Eldritch had already once recorded (if not released) with his Sisterhood collaborators. Also, the B-side featured "Torch", the last song from the previous line-up. Then-manager Boyd Steemson maintains the chart success was no surprise for the band.

Eldritch has later considered producer Steinman to have been more pivotal in securing funding for additional production than the songs themselves.

The band did not play live during this period, but did mime Top of the Pops, among others. "This Corrosion", "Dominion" and "Lucretia My Reflection" were released as singles, the videos for which would be compiled on the 1988 VHS release Shot, alongside a video for "1959".

Vision Thing era (1989–1993)
The next incarnation of the Sisters of Mercy featured an unknown German guitarist, Andreas Bruhn, whom Eldritch apparently discovered playing in a Hamburg pub and brought into the band in April 1989; bassist Tony James (ex-Sigue Sigue Sputnik guitarist and Generation X bassist/songwriter); and last-minute recruit Tim Bricheno, formerly of All About Eve, on guitars. The new line-up kicked off with the Vision Thing album, released in October 1990, produced by Eldritch (one song, the single "More", was a co-production and co-written with Steinman). The album also featured guitarist John Perry with backing vocals by Maggie Reilly. The title is from a quotation by then-Vice President George Bush in 1987 and it marked another change of direction, this time towards guitar-oriented rock.

The band launched a 1990–91 world tour to promote the album. In 1991 they organised a controversial North American tour in double-act with Public Enemy. Fearing a clash between white fans of the Sisters with the black following of Public Enemy, several cities banned the performances, and the tour was cancelled halfway through. Late in 1991, bassist James left the group for his solo career; the band continued by using a pre-recorded backing track. The US tour fiasco did not help the already strained relationship between Eldritch and the Sisters' new record company EastWest, a WEA subsidiary (the band was assigned to it 1989 following an internal shuffle in WEA). Conflicts with WEA led to the termination of the band's US record distribution deal circa 1991–92, meaning later recordings are only available in the US as imports.

Under the insistence of the record company the band re-recorded their early single "Temple of Love" (with Ofra Haza on additional vocals, and Tony James on bass) to promote the collection of their early independently released singles, entitled Some Girls Wander By Mistake (1992). Early into the year, the band performed the track in Top of the Pops with Haza and Tony James, marking the final time the recording line-up for Vision Thing shared the stage.

In June 1992, Eldritch dismissed Boyd Steemson, the band's manager of ten years.

Around this time, Bricheno had begun focusing on his other band, XC-NN (originally, CNN). Meanwhile, Bruhn released his debut solo album, Broon. Bruhn claimed the songs on the album were offered for the next Sisters release, only to be rejected by Eldritch. Eldritch denied these allegations, saying he was never offered the songs.

Bricheno left by the end of the year and was replaced in 1993 by Adam Pearson. Pearson was the only guitarist on the single "Under the Gun", which also featured former Berlin lead vocalist Terri Nunn on backing vocals. The track was co-produced by Billie Hughes, co-writer of the song. The single was recorded to promote the "greatest hits" compilation, A Slight Case of Overbombing (1993). A third video album, Shot Rev 2.0, would also be released, containing all videos from the original Shot in 1988, the videos for the Vision Thing singles "More", "Doctor Jeep", as well as the videos for "Under the Gun", the 1992 re-recording of "Temple of Love" and a video for the album track "Detonation Boulevard". Bruhn left the band in 1993. These releases turned out to be the last commercial recordings until the 2021 release of the BBC sessions 1982-1984 on vinyl for RSD and CD, containing the 1982 and 1984 Peel Sessions and the 1983 David 'Kid' Jensen session.

Feud with EastWest Records (1993–1997)
Following the last concerts in December 1993, the Sisters of Mercy went into what Eldritch called a "strike against EastWest". He was alluded to have been preoccupied with legal matters surrounding the band; although Eldritch has never explained the meaning behind this, it has been suggested by various parties that the issues stemmed from either the short-lived tour with Public Enemy in 1991, or, alternatively, Eldritch's ongoing issues with EastWest Records, as the band still owed them two original studio albums.

In 1995, Eldritch remixed two songs for the German group Die Krupps and appeared on the Sarah Brightman single "A Question of Honour".

Eldritch's associates approached Gary Marx, the co-founding member, to write tracks for a new studio album. Marx then met with Eldritch, with the two agreeing upon the terms under which the backing tracks would be produced. After Marx delivered a total of eleven tracks, Eldritch backed out of the project 'without uttering a single word'.

In 1996, the band was revived for several gigs supporting the Sex Pistols, with Bruhn's place initially taken by Chris Sheehan. During subsequent tours, the guitarist spot would rotate between Sheehan and Mike Varjak.

In late 1997, the contract with EastWest was terminated, after the company agreed to accept material recorded under the SSV name instead of two albums for which the Sisters of Mercy had contractual obligations. The company agreed to accept the material (techno-like droning featuring mumbling vocals by Andrew Eldritch, without drums) without listening to it first. The recordings were never officially released and circulated only through pirate MP3s.

Following the release, the official Sisters of Mercy website contained the same "update" for several years:

Possible fourth studio album

In October 2006, Side-Line Music Magazine announced that the band was in talks with the Universal sublabel W14 Music. In the same year, three Sisters of Mercy reissues were released on 3 November in Europe (and 30 October in the USA) via WEA International: First and Last and Always (1985), Floodland (1987) and Vision Thing (1990). All contained bonus tracks taken from related single releases.

The Sisters of Mercy have not released new recorded material since 1993. In 2010 Eldritch confirmed that he currently sees no reason to release an album in an interview with Classic Rock contributor Joel McIver. In August 2010, when asked to elaborate, Eldritch pointed time constraints and lack of available material as some of the problems involved.

Speculation about a new release was renewed in November 2016 when Eldritch was quoted by TeamRock website: "I can tell you one thing: If Donald Trump actually does become President, that will be reason enough for me to release another album. I don't think I could keep quiet if that happened."  The band has yet to release any new material, but in 2017 they embarked on a European tour in August and September. Since 2012, some of the shows featured a guest appearance by the Irish singer Lisa Cuthbert who performs her cover version of "This Corrosion" on piano.

Influence
Eldritch cited the Psychedelic Furs, Slade, Pere Ubu and David Bowie as his primary influences. Eldritch also cited Motörhead, The Cramps and Siouxsie and the Banshees among his early influences. According to Jennifer Park, the band have also cited Leonard Cohen, Hawkwind, Gary Glitter, Lou Reed and The Velvet Underground, Iggy and the Stooges, Suicide, The Birthday Party and The Fall as among their influences. 

Whilst the band enjoys a considerable fan base with overlapping interests in so-called dark culture, the Sisters of Mercy consider themselves first and foremost a rock band. They have discouraged their association with "goth" via regular public statements in the press, and stipulations in their standard contract riders. Nevertheless, this has not stopped them from regularly appearing at festivals where this music is featured, such as M'era Luna.

Personnel

Members

Current members
 Andrew Eldritch – vocals, keyboards, guitars, drum programming (1980–1985, 1987–present), drums (1980)
 Ben Christo – guitars, backing vocals, bass (2006–present)
 Dylan Smith – guitars, backing vocals (2019–present) 

Touring musicians
 Ravey Davey – Doktor Avalanche operator (1996; 2008; 2012–present)

Former members
 Gary Marx – guitars, (1980–1985) vocals (1980)
 Keith Fuller – vocals (1980)
 Claire Shearsby – keyboards (1980)
 Jon Langford – keyboards (1980)
 Dave Humphrey – guitars (1981)
 Tom Ashton - guitars (1981)
 Craig Adams – bass (1981–1985)
 Ben Gunn – guitars (1981–1983)
 Wayne Hussey – guitars, backing vocals (1983–1985)
 Patricia Morrison – bass, backing vocals (1987–1989)
 Andreas Bruhn – guitars (1989–1993)
 Tony James – bass (1989–1991)
 Tim Bricheno – guitars (1990–1992)
 Adam Pearson – guitars, backing vocals, bass (1993–2006)
 Chris Sheehan – guitars, backing vocals (1996, 2000–2005)
 Mike Varjak – guitars (1997–2000)
 Chris Catalyst – guitars, backing vocals (2005–2019)

Former touring musicians
Dan Donovan – keyboards (1990–1991)
Simon Denbigh – Doktor Avalanche operator (1996–2012)

Timeline

Line-ups

Doktor Avalanche
The original incarnation of Doktor Avalanche was a BOSS DR-55 ("Doctor Rhythm"); the Doktor was later replaced by a Roland TR-606, soon followed by a TR-808, and, briefly, a TR-909. On one album, First and Last and Always, an Oberheim DMX bore the Doktor name.

With increased financial resources from sale of the album, the Doktor was upgraded to a Yamaha RX5, and subsequently reinforced by Akai S900 and S1000 samplers. An Akai S3200 has been used as studio equipment. Soon after, the first digital Doktor appeared in the form of a set of Compaq portable PCs, which had to be scrapped when it became impossible to maintain them because of a lack of spare parts.

In recent years the "Digital Doktor" has been moved to a custom-built laptop designed by Eldritch and constructed by an English military software and hardware company. For a time there was some division in the band whether or not the Doktor should be moved to a Mac running Logic or remain as is.

In a 2011 interview with a New Zealand radio station, Eldritch said Doktor Avalanche was now a MacBook Pro laptop running Steinberg Cubase.

Doktor Avalanche also "runs" the on-line advice column on the group's website.

Discography

First and Last and Always (1985)
Floodland (1987)
Vision Thing (1990)

References

External links

 Official website
 Official UK website
 The Sisters of Mercy history

 
English gothic rock groups
English new wave musical groups
Musical groups established in 1980
Post-punk groups from Leeds
Warner Music Group artists
Elektra Records artists
East West Records artists
Rhino Records artists